Hélia Correia (born 1949) is a Portuguese novelist, playwright, poet and translator.

Early life
Correia was born in Lisbon in February 1949, and raised in Mafra, her mother's home town. Her father was an anti-fascist who was arrested before her birth by the Salazar regime.

At the University of Lisbon, she studied Romance Philology. During these years, she began publishing poetry in literary supplements of the time, such as the Juvenil do Diário de Lisboa under the aegis of Mário Castrim.

Career
After a period working as a high school teacher, Hélia Correia undertook postgraduate studies in Classical Theatre.

Her literary career started in earnest in the 1981 with the publication of her debut work titled O Separar das Águas. She quickly achieved great commercial success and critical renown, with critics lauding her innovative writing which remained linked to the best literary traditions. They saw influences of Camilo Castelo Branco and Emily Brontë, as well as connections to ancient Greek drama.

Several of her novels, including O Número dos Vivos (1982) and Montedemo (1983), could be considered works of magical realism. Correia accepted this saying she could not ignore the importance of South American magical realism.

Some critics have noted that her earlier works were influenced by French Feminist thought. Maria Teresa Horta has described Correia's works as "visceral" and "primordial".

From the 1990s, she began to create theatrical works. She reinterpreted ancient Greek myths from the view point of female heroines, such as Antigone in Perdition, Helen of Troy in Hatred, and Medea in Boundless.

In 2001, her most popular book, Lillias Fraser, appeared, set between 1746 and 1762 and ranging across Scotland and Portugal, covering the earthquake of Lisbon. The book won the Portuguese PEN Club prize.

Works

Fiction
1981 – O Separar das Águas
1982 – O Número dos Vivos
1983 – Montedemo
1985 – Villa Celeste
1987 – Soma
1988 – A Fenda Erótica
1991 – A Casa Eterna
1996 – Insânia
2001 – Lillias Fraser 
2001 – Antartida de mil folhas
2002 – Apodera-te de mim
2008 – Contos
2014 – Vinte degraus e outros contos

Poetry
1986 – A Pequena Morte / Esse Eterno Canto
2012 – A Terceira Miséria

Theatre
1991 – Perdição, Exercício sobre Antígona
1991 – Florbela
2000 – O Rancor, Exercício sobre Helena
2005 – O Segredo de Chantel
2008 – A Ilha Encantada

For children
1988 – A Luz de Newton (seven stories about colours)

Awards and honors
2001 Portuguese PEN Club prize - for Lillias Fraser
2006 Prémio Máxima de Literatura - for Bastardia
2010 Prémio da Fundação Inês de Castro - for Adoecer 
2012 Casino da Póvoa prize - for her poetry collection A Terceira Miséria
2013 Vergílio Ferreira Prize - for her entire oeuvre, awarded by the University of Évora
2013 Prémio Literário Correntes d'Escritas - for A Terceira Miséria, a tribute to Greece.
2015 Grand Prize Camilo Castelo Branco - for 20 Degraus e Outros Contos.
2015 Camões Prize

References

External links

1949 births
Living people
People from Lisbon
21st-century Portuguese novelists
20th-century Portuguese novelists
20th-century Portuguese women writers
21st-century Portuguese women writers
Camões Prize winners
21st-century Portuguese dramatists and playwrights
20th-century Portuguese dramatists and playwrights
20th-century Portuguese poets
21st-century Portuguese poets
Portuguese women dramatists and playwrights
Portuguese women novelists
Portuguese women poets